The Coucou des Flandres, is a criticallyendangered Belgian breed of domestic chicken. It may have a common origin with the Malines from the area of Mechelen, in the province of Antwerp in Flanders, or may indeed represent the original type of that breed before it was cross-bred in the nineteenth century with various different types of imported Oriental chicken. By the time of the First World War it had disappeared; it was re-created in the years before the Second World War. It is critically endangered in Belgium, but more numerous in Picardy in France. It may also be known as the Poulet de Dendre, for the Dender river in its area of origin.

History

The origins of the Coucou des Flandres are unknown. It may have existed for hundreds of years. It is apparently related to the Malines from the area of Mechelen, in the province of Antwerp in Flanders. It may perhaps represent the original type of the Malines breed before it was cross-bred in the nineteenth century with various different types of imported Oriental chicken including birds brought from Shanghai, China, to the zoological gardens of Antwerp as well as Brahma, Langshan and Cochin birds. 

The Coucou des Flandres had disappeared by the time of the First World War, but was re-created in the years before the Second World War. It is critically endangered in Belgium, where in 2005 a census found only 53 birds. It is more numerous in northern Picardy in France.

Characteristics

The Coucou des Flandres has only one plumage variety, cuckoo. The comb is single; the legs are pinkish-white and unfeathered.

Use

Coucou des Flandres hens lay about 150 cream-coloured eggs per year, with a weight of about  They are good mothers and good sitters.

References

Further reading

 J.-M. Larivière, J. Detilleux, P. Leroy (2011). Estimates of inbreeding rates in forty traditional Belgian chicken breeds populations = Schätzung des Inzuchtgrades bei vierzig einheimischen Belgischen Hühnerrassen. Archiv für Geflügelkunde 75 (1): 1- 6.

Chicken breeds
Chicken breeds originating in Belgium